Eysajan Kurban (born 6 January 2000) is a Chinese footballer currently playing as a left winger or forward for Zhejiang Professional.

Club career
Eysajan Kurban would be promoted to the senior team of Guangzhou before being loaned out to second tier football club Qingdao Qingchundao for the 2020 China League Two season. In the following league campaign he transferred to second tier club Zhejiang Professional where he made his debut in a league game on 24 April 2021 against Zibo Cuju in a 4-0 victory. This would be followed by his first goal for the club on 5 May 2021 in a league game against Meizhou Hakka in a 1-0 victory. He would be a squad player as the club gained promotion to the top tier at the end of the 2021 campaign.

Career statistics
.

References

External links
Eysajan Kurban at Worldfootball.net

2000 births
Living people
Chinese footballers
Association football forwards
China League Two players
China League One players
Guangzhou F.C. players
Zhejiang Professional F.C. players